Yaak may refer to:

People:
Yaak Karsunke (born 1934), German author and actor
Yaak Uudmae (born 1954), retired Estonian triple jumper and long jumper, 1980 Olympic gold medallist

Locations:
Yaak, Montana, unincorporated town in Lincoln County, Montana, United States
Yaak River, tributary of the Kootenay River in Montana, USA and British Columbia, Canada
Yaak Air Force Station, closed United States Air Force General Surveillance Radar station

See also
Yaaks
Yaaku (disambiguation)
Yak